100 is the natural number following 99 and preceding 101.

100 may also refer to:

 100 BC
 AD 100

Film and television
 100 (2008 film), a Filipino film
 100 (2019 film), an Indian film
 "One Hundred" (Aqua Teen Hunger Force), an episode of Aqua Teen Hunger Force
 "100" (Criminal Minds), an episode of Criminal Minds
 "100" (Fear the Walking Dead), an episode of Fear the Walking Dead
 "100" (Glee), an episode of Glee
 "100" (30 Rock), an episode of 30 Rock
 100 (audio drama), an audio drama based on Doctor Who

Music
 100 (EP), a 2014 EP by KB
 100 (album), an album by Andy Stochansky
 100, an album by Dear Jane
 "100" (The Game song) (2015)
 "100" (SuperM song) (2020)

Other uses 
 100 (DC Comics), fictional organized crime groups appearing in DC Comics
 100 (emergency telephone number)
 100 (MBTA bus)
 100 (play), a play produced by TheImaginaryBody
 100 Club, a music venue in London
 Audi 100, a mid-sized automobile, precursor of Audi A6
 Lenovo IdeaPad 100, a discontinued brand of notebook computers
 Siu Hong stop (MTR digital station code 100), a Light Rail stop in Tuen Mun, Hong Kong

See also

 100 (comics), a list of comics topics with 100 in the title
 100s (disambiguation)
 The 100 (disambiguation)
 "100 A.D." (American Dad!), an episode of American Dad!
 100 Hekate, the 100th numbered minor planet, an asteroid discovered in 1868
 100% (disambiguation)
 100 points (disambiguation)
 Fermium, chemical element with atomic number 100
 100 series (disambiguation)
 Hundred (disambiguation)